Shaogang is a town under the administration of Yucheng County, Henan, China. , it has 43 villages under its administration.

References 

Township-level divisions of Henan
Yucheng County